St. Libory or Saint Libory is a village in St. Clair County, Illinois, United States. The population was 615 at the 2010 census.

Geography
St. Libory is located at  (38.364559, -89.714107).

Demographics

At the 2000 census, there were 583 people, 213 households and 158 families residing in the village. The racial makeup of the village was 98.28% White, 0.17% African American, and 1.54% from two or more races. Hispanic or Latino of any race were 0.34% of the population.

There were 213 households, of which 40.8% had children under the age of 18 living with them, 60.1% were married couples living together, 10.3% had a female householder with no husband present, and 25.8% were non-families. 22.5% of all households were made up of individuals, and 12.2% had someone living alone who was 65 years of age or older. The average household size was 2.74 and the average family size was 3.23.

Age distribution was 28.6% under the age of 18, 7.9% from 18 to 24, 28.5% from 25 to 44, 20.8% from 45 to 64, and 14.2% who were 65 years of age or older. The median age was 36 years. For every 100 females, there were 85.7 males. For every 100 females age 18 and over, there were 85.7 males.

The median household income was $50,625, and the median family income was $56,625. Males had a median income of $37,273 versus $28,056 for females. The per capita income for the village was $20,024. About 3.5% of families and 6.0% of the population were below the poverty line, including 8.6% of those under age 18 and 6.5% of those age 65 or over.

Registered historic places
 Rutter Store

References

Villages in St. Clair County, Illinois
Villages in Illinois